Dongguan Gymnasium has been used to describe two different venues in Dongguan, Guangdong, China.

 Dongguan Arena (opened 1994)
 Dongfeng Nissan Cultural and Sports Centre also called Dongguan Basketball Center (opened 2014)